Daniel Hisgen (April 10, 1733 probably in Nieder-Weisel, Hesse, Germany – February 19, 1812 in Lich) was a German painter of the rococo period who worked as a church painter in Upper Hesse, specializing on cycles of paintings decorating the front of the gallery parapet in churches with an upper gallery. His discreet cycles demonstrate the modest prominence expected of Lutheran art in German churches of his day, taking a middle route between the large and prominent images in Catholic churches, and the complete absence of images in Calvinist ones.

Life and family 

The ancestors of the Hisgen (meaning "little house") family fled as Huguenots from France to the Netherlands and then distributed to the area near Montabaur, Wetzlar and Lich. Daniel Hisgen was the oldest son of the Protestant pastor Johann Georg Hisgen (August 30, 1707 - June 2, 1769) and his wife Johannetta Judith Budoin (Johanna Budi) (February 4, 1706 - February 23, 1765). Daniel's godmother was an unmarried sister of his father. Johann Georg was a native of Wetzlar and pastor at Nieder-Weisel (Butzbach) for 37 years from 1732 to his death. Daniel grew up in the village of Nieder-Weisel where his parents are still buried in a crypt in the Protestant church. When the church records of Nieder-Weisel were destroyed by fire in 1761, Johann Georg and the villagers created a new church book from memory for the years from 1690 to 1761. Nieder-Weisel citizens and Johann Georg went all the way to the Reichskammergericht (highest court in the Holy Roman Empire) on a dispute about building defects.

On November 28, 1769 Daniel Hisgen married Philippina Louisa Stiehl (baptized August 8, 1747 - August 8, 1820) from Alten-Buseck. A penance was imposed on both because the first daughter Johannetta Catharina (December 21, 1769 - March 3, 1834) was born just four weeks after the wedding. Daniel settled in Lich and the marriage produced five children. The oldest daughter remained unmarried, the others were Friedrich Wilhelm (March 22, 1773 - March 1, 1853), Maria Elisabetha (Born May 5, 1775), Christian Wilhelm (April 13, 1777 - May 27, 1839) and Johann Heinrich (born June 30, 1780). Godfather of the latter was Daniel's brother Johann Henrich Hisgen, who is documented as a "Kauf- und Handelsmann in Wetzlar" (tradesman in Wetzlar).

The oldest son Friedrich Wilhelm, a government secretary in Hungen, was married to Catharina Margartha Rouge (born January 6, 1786). The couple had 14 children including a son called Georg Konrad (April 20, 1820 in Lich - March 16, 1898), who emigrated without his wife Katharina Preiss (1819-1898) to America. Daniel's fourth child, Christian Wilhelm, also became a painter and a merchant and grocer. He married Katharina Elisabeth Hornivius (1775 - April 13, 1859) and had six children, including Johann Conrad Hisgen (August 9, 1810 - May 26, 1897). Johann Conrad, painter and varnisher, was in his first marriage married to  Anna Margarete Jung (August 14, 1815 - June 5, 1836). After her death he married Juliana Barbara Völnele. In his third marriage he had four children. He emigrated to America and left a half year old child in Hameln, for which he was sentenced to jail for four weeks. Carl Quirin Hisgen (March 21, 1812 - June 11, 1894), another son of Christian Wilhelm, became a painter and emigrated to America. A grandson of Christian Wilhelm, called Karl Maximilian Hisgen (February 2, 1844 - July 12, 1905) became a painter, also his eponymous son Karl Maximilian (October 7, 1878). Johann Heinrich, fifth child of Daniel Hisgen, temporarily lived in Engelrod. In 1818 he painted a portrait of Martin Luther with a swan (oil on wood) for the Protestant church in Nieder-Oberrod, and 1837 a similar scene in a medallion for the Protestant church in Michelbach (Schotten). In 1847 he is documented as a picture restorer in Darmstadt. Probably the most famous descendant of Daniel Hisgen is Thomas L. Hisgen (November 26, 1858 - August 27, 1925), an American petroleum producer and politician.

Work 

Hisgen emerges primarily as a church painter in Upper Hesse and worked mainly in what is now the Giessen district, but also sporadically in the Wetzlar area and in the Vogelsberg region. His identity has long been unclear, so that he was provisionally designated as the "Freienseer Master". Due to his characteristic style and the cyclic structure of his gallery-paintings with biblical motifs, the parapet-paintings on railings in Bobenhausen II, Albach, Burkhardsfelden, Freienseen and Odenhausen/Lahn were attributed to the same artist. The biblical characters on the pictures wear contemporary clothes of the Rococo period, which is particularly evident in the pictures of the infant Moses rescued by the Egyptian princess from the river. The characters in these scenes are shown in the same way in all cycles. Comparable to the bible illustrations by Christoph Murer in the Tübingen Bible (1591), Hisgen stands in the tradition of the Biblia pauperum. These works of provincial art lean on models, but develop those in the late Baroque style, which is reflected in the use of light on moving figures. This synthesis has been called a "dramatic art of the simple" ("Dramatik des Schlichten"). In Atzbach and other churches his students or children are chronicled to have contributed with "clumsy hands" ("ungeschickteren Händen") on the parapet-paintings, suggesting the good reputation of the master.

Until 2015 twelve upper Hessian churches (all heritage listed) have been identified as having pictures with biblical scenes by Hisgen. In general there is the same number of pictures from the Old Testament and the New Testament. Illustrations of the Passion make the biggest part among paintings from the New Testament. The more than 300 images show 66 scenes from the Bible, from which 28 scenes have been painted only once. Hisgen used the same compositions for illustrations that occur repeatedly, like the Annunciation and the Birth of Christ.  Exceptionally, the paintings in the church in Pohl-Göns  only show apostles and evangelists. Some cycles have tituli or captions with the related biblical passage.

As a church painter Hisgen also painted church ceilings and other works. A first activity as a painter can be traced on a bill from Nieder-Weisel in 1754. It's unknown where Hisgen learnt the craft of painting, perhaps he was self-taught. In the years 1762/1763 he worked for 126 days on new surfaces for the pulpit and the princes gallery in St. Mary's collegiate church in Lich, for which he received 292 Guilder. In the church in Albach Hisgen decorated the cheeks of the church pews with floral pattern and the corners of the ceiling with angel medallions. In 1778 he gilded the finial, the weathervane and the star of the church in the Ober-Hörgern. In 1780 Hisgen provided the organ case of St. Mary's collegiate church in Lich in 1780 with a new edging and gilding and painted the casing silver. 1808, in the high age of 75 years, Hisgen painted the church in Odenhausen (Lahn). In November 2015, a small painting with an idyllic landscape by Hisgen was discovered in Lich.

List of works 
In many cases authorship is based on attributions and style comparisons. Preserved paintings put on the parapets of galleries can be found in the following churches:

Further reading 
 Georg Dehio: Handbuch der Deutschen Kunstdenkmäler, Hessen I: Regierungsbezirke Gießen und Kassel, edited by Folkhard Cremer, Tobias Michael Wolf and others, Deutscher Kunstverlag, München / Berlin 2008, 
 Peter Weyrauch: Die Kirchen des Altkreises Gießen, Mittelhessische Druck- und Verlagsgesellschaft, Gießen 1979
 Heinz-Lothar Worm: Daniel Hisgen, der Maler unserer Emporenbilder, in: Unterstützungsverein der Ev. Kirchengemeinden Dorlar und Atzbach (Ed.): Wenn Gott sich zeigt. 43 Andachten zu den Emporenbildern der Ev. Kirche Atzbach, Kirchengemeinde Atzbach, Atzbach 2012, p. 8–9

External links 

 so: Bildtafeln kehren in die Atzbacher Kirche zurück, Gießener Allgemeine, 19. April 2011 
 Hisgen Family Project

References 

Rococo painters
18th-century German painters
18th-century German male artists
German male painters
Christian artists
1733 births
1812 deaths
Lutheran art
19th-century German painters
19th-century German male artists